Bonbeach railway station is located on the Frankston line in Victoria, Australia. It serves the south-eastern Melbourne suburb of Bonbeach, and it opened on 15 February 1926.

In 1977, boom barriers replaced hand gates at the former Bondi Road level crossing, which was located at the Down end of the station. A control panel was also provided in that year. In 1981, the former ground level station buildings were rebuilt. In 1982, the control panel was abolished.

In 2015, new passenger amenities were added to the former ground level station, including passenger information displays, additional myki readers, a network status board and an additional shelter at the Up end of Platform 1. Safety improvements, including additional CCTV cameras as well as tactile platform edges, were also provided.

As part of the Level Crossing Removal Project, the station was reconstructed to remove the adjacent level crossing at Bondi Road, with works commencing on 26 July 2021. The removal was done simultaneously along the grade separation of Chelsea and Edithvale. On 22 November of that year, the rebuilt station opened to passengers. The new station consists of two side platforms lowered into a trench, with Bondi Road passing overhead nearby. The former pedestrian level crossing at Golden Avenue was converted into a pedestrian overpass, whilst the crossing at Broadway was abolished.

The station was used in the Australian television comedy series Kath & Kim in episode two of series four, as the location of a Gloria Jean's coffee cart grand opening party.

Platforms and services

Bonbeach has two side platforms. It is serviced by Metro Trains' Frankston line services.

Platform 1:
  all stations and limited express services to Flinders Street, Werribee and Williamstown

Platform 2:
  all stations services to Frankston

Gallery

References

External links
 Melway map at street-directory.com.au

Railway stations in Melbourne
Railway stations in Australia opened in 1926
Railway stations in the City of Kingston (Victoria)